Francis Stewart 5th Earl of Bothwell.

Francis Stewart may also refer to:

Francis Stewart (Australian politician and rugby player)
Francis Stewart, but for the attainder 2nd (or 6th) Earl of Bothwell (c. 1584–1640)
Captain Francis Stewart of Coldingham (died c.1683), cavalry officer who was heir to Earldom of Bothwell

See also
Frank Stewart (disambiguation)
Frances Stewart (disambiguation)
Francis Stuart (disambiguation)